"The Treasury of Croesus" is a 1995 Donald Duck comic story by Don Rosa. The story was first published in the Danish Anders And & Co. #1995-04; the first American publication was serialized in Walt Disney's Comics and Stories #601-603, in February-June 1996.

Plot
Scrooge McDuck foils what Donald Duck calls "Magica De Spell's most bizarre and complex scheme yet". Donald says neither of them will be satisfied until becoming so rich as Croesus. Scrooge says he's already richer than Croesus once was (actually the doubt about who's the richest man on history remains a doubt around all the story). His three grandnephews tell Scrooge about an exposition at the Duckburg Museum  on Croesus. This visit leads our heroes in search of his fabled treasure, as Scrooge himself did 50 years ago. They find the treasure, but due to a rightful ownership by the Turkish locals, all Scrooge keeps is his first coin. Upon learning that a witch named Circe wanted the first coin minted by Croesus for the same reason Magica wants the Number One Dime, Scrooge finds a way to turn this tragedy in a triumph: he gives the coin to Magica. If the spell works, she will no longer try to steal his Number One Dime. Because it doesn't, much to Donald's relief as she tested the amulet on him, Scrooge is now sure he is richer than Croesus once was.

External links

Disney comics stories
Donald Duck comics by Don Rosa
1995 in comics
Treasure hunt comics